Chuynli (also Romanized as Chūynlī; also known as Chūnlī, Chīvīlī, and Chooli) is a village in Dowlatkhaneh Rural District, Bajgiran District, Quchan County, Razavi Khorasan Province, Iran. At the 2006 census, its population was 117, in 28 families.

References 

Populated places in Quchan County